The white-spotted tree skink (Lamprolepis leucosticta) is a species of skink known only from West Java, Indonesia. It is an uncommon arboreal species.

References

Lamprolepis
Reptiles described in 1923
Reptiles of Indonesia
Taxa named by Lorenz Müller